Adkhamjon Achilov (born 7 April 1976) is a Uzbekistani wrestler. He competed at the 1996 Summer Olympics and the 2000 Summer Olympics.

References

External links

1976 births
Living people
Uzbekistani male sport wrestlers
Olympic wrestlers of Uzbekistan
Wrestlers at the 1996 Summer Olympics
Wrestlers at the 2000 Summer Olympics
Place of birth missing (living people)
Wrestlers at the 1998 Asian Games
Asian Games competitors for Uzbekistan
World Wrestling Championships medalists
20th-century Uzbekistani people
21st-century Uzbekistani people